A Seventh Man is a book, in the form of photography and text by John Berger and Jean Mohr, on migrant workers in Europe. It was first published in 1975.

In 1972, Berger's novel G., a romantic picaresque set in the Europe of 1898, won both the James Tait Black Memorial Prize and the Booker Prize in 1972.  When accepting the Booker award Berger made a point of donating half his cash prize to the British Black Panthers (inspired by but unaffiliated with the American organization), and retaining half to support his work on the study of migrant workers that became A Seventh Man, insisting on both as necessary parts of his political struggle.

The book has been cited by South African musician Johnny Clegg as a key influence on his debut album Universal Men.

External links
Extract from 'A Seventh Man' published in Race & Class, 1975

Footnotes

1975 non-fiction books
Photographic collections and books
Sociology books